Michael Scott  (born 1981) is a British classical scholar, ancient historian, and presenter. He is professor of classics and ancient history at the University of Warwick.

In 2015 he was a foundation fellow of the Warwick International Higher Education Academy; he was appointed a senior fellow of the Higher Education Academy in 2016. He was a National Teaching Fellow in 2017, and in 2017–2018 was a Leverhulme Research Fellow.

In 2020 he became the co-director of the Warwick Institute of Engagement. 

He is president of the Lytham Saint Annes branch of the Classical Association.

He was awarded the Classical Association Prize in 2021, this is awarded to the individual who has done the most to raise the profile of Classics in the public eye. 

He was named as the International Lego Classicist of the Year in 2022.

Publications 
X Marks the Spot: The Story of Archaeology in Eight Extraordinary Discoveries (2023) 
Life in Ancient Greece (2019) Ruby Tuesday Books. 
M I Finley: An Ancient Historian and His Impact (2016) Cambridge University Press. Edited Volume (Co-editor with Prof Robin Osborne and Daniel Jew). .
Ancient Worlds: An Epic History of East and West (2016) Hutchinson/Windmill. .
Delphi: centre oISBN 978-1788560405f the ancient world (2014) Princeton University Press. .
Space and society in the Greek and Roman worlds (Key Themes in Ancient History series) (2012) Cambridge University Press. .
Risk in our time: Proceedings of the Darwin College Lecture Series 2010. (Co-editor with Dr Layla Skinns and Tony Cox) Cambridge University Press. .
Delphi and Olympia: the spatial politics of panhellenism in the archaic and classical periods (2010) Cambridge University Press. .
From Democrats to Kings: the brutal dawn of a new world from the downfall of Athens to the rise of Alexander the Great (2009) Icon Books. .

TV Programmes 

 Ancient Invisible Cities: Cairo, Athens, Istanbul (2018) 
 Sicily: Wonder of the Mediterranean (2017) 
 This is Greece with Michael Scott (2016) 
 Italy’s Invisible Cities: Naples, Florence, Venice (2016) 
 Rome’s Invisible City (2015) 
 The Quizeum (2015) 
 Roman Britain From the Air (2014) 
 Who Were the Greeks? (2013) 
 The Mystery of the X Tombs (2013) 
 Ancient Greece: The Greatest Show on Earth (2013) 
 Jesus: Rise to Power (2013) 
 Guilty Pleasures: Luxury in the Ancient  and Medieval  Worlds (2011)
 Delphi: bellybutton of the ancient world (2010)

Podcasts 

 History Hit – The Ancients – Zeus: King of the Gods (2022) 
 The Classics Podcast – EPIC: Modern Writers, Ancient Stories: 'The River' (2022) 
 You’re Dead To Me – Athenian Democracy (2022) 
 History Hit – The Ancients – Ancient Greek Symposium: How To Party Like An Ancient Greek (2022) 
 Against the Lore – Buildings (2022) 
 Ithaca Bound – Delphi (2021) 
 History Hack – Disney’s Hercules, Fact or Fiction? (2021) 
 A Somewhat Complete History of Sitting Down (2021) 
 You’re Dead To Me – The Battle of Salamis (2020) 
 History Hack – Delphi (2020) 
 History Hit Network – Delphi (2020) 
 You’re Dead To Me – The Ancient Olympics (2020) 
 You’re Dead To Me – The Spartans (2019)

References

1981 births
Living people
Alumni of Christ's College, Cambridge
Senior Fellows of the Higher Education Academy